Luny may refer to:

 Luny, from Luny Tunes
 Luny Unold (born 1920), Swiss figure skater
 Thomas Luny (1759–1837), English artist and painter